Loveless may refer to:

Film and television
 Loveless (film), a 2017 Russian film
 The Loveless, a 1982 film starring Willem Dafoe
 Dr. Loveless, a character in The Wild Wild West TV series and film adaptation

Literature
 Loveless (comics), a comic book by Brian Azzarello and Marcelo Frusin
 Loveless (manga), a fantasy manga series by Yun Kouga
 Loveless, a 2020 novel by Alice Oseman

Music

Groups
 Loveless (American band), a rock band
 Loveless (Japanese band), a rock band formed by Nana Kitade

Albums
 Loveless (album), an album by My Bloody Valentine
 Loveless, an album by Dream On, Dreamer

Songs
 "Hard Feelings/Loveless", a song by Lorde from Melodrama
 "Loveless", a song by Kittie from Until the End
 "Loveless", a song by Luna Sea from Mother 
 "Love Less", a song by New Order from Technique
 "Loveless", a song by Said the Whale from Little Mountain 
 "Loveless", a song by Tomohisa Yamashita

Other uses
 Loveless (surname)
 Loveless, Alabama, a community in Alabama, United States
 Loveless Cafe, a cafe in Nashville, Tennessee, United States
 Loveless, a fictional poetry book and play adaptation in Crisis Core: Final Fantasy VII